Quill and Dagger is a senior honor society at Cornell University. It is often recognized as one of the most prominent societies of its type, along with Skull and Bones and Scroll and Key at Yale University. In 1929, The New York Times stated that election into Quill and Dagger and similar societies constituted "the highest non-scholastic honor within reach of undergraduates."

Origins
Founded on May 28, 1893, Quill and Dagger seeks to recognize exemplary undergraduates at Cornell University who have shown leadership, character, and dedication to service. The society has existed continually since its founding over a century ago and was one of the first of the Ivy League societies to open its membership to women.

Secrecy
The meetings and proceedings of Quill and Dagger are closed, and the society's contributions and activities on campus are typically concealed. Membership remained secret for a brief period after its founding, but the names of newly tapped members are now published in The Cornell Daily Sun each semester.

Influence

As with any organization of a secretive nature, it is difficult to make conclusions regarding Quill and Dagger's influence. In 2006, its members held more than half of the positions on the "25 Most Influential Undergraduates" list published by The Cornell Daily Sun. Twelve members were profiled in the book The 100 Most Notable Cornellians.

At Cornell
Many alumni in administrative positions at Cornell University have held membership, specifically directors of athletics, deans of the various colleges, alumni affairs officers, and chairmen of the Board of Trustees and Cornellian Council. For example, although membership comprises approximately one percent of each graduating class, typically around 15% to 20% of the Cornell University Board of Trustees and Cornell University Council are Quill and Dagger members. More than 30% of the individuals in the Cornell Athletic Hall of Fame hold membership in the society.

Names of Quill and Dagger members can be found on buildings throughout campus, including Barton Hall, Corson Hall, Friedman Wrestling Center, Hollister Hall, Hoy Field, Kennedy Hall, Kimball Hall, Lynah Rink, Moakley House, Rand Hall, Rhodes Hall, Schoellkopf Memorial Hall, Teagle Hall, and others. Other buildings, such as the War Memorial, bear the emblem of the society.

Since its founding, Quill and Dagger has been well connected with the presidents of Cornell University. The two sons, grandson, and grandson-in-law of President Jacob Gould Schurman were members, as was his private secretary. Other members have included the son-in-law of President Livingston Farrand and the assistants to presidents Edmund Ezra Day, Deane Waldo Malott, and James A. Perkins. All of the presidents from Dale Corson to Jeffrey S. Lehman were selected for honorary membership in the society. Nearly half of the presidential search committee that selected Hunter Rawlings and one quarter of the committee that selected David J. Skorton were Quill and Dagger members.

Members of the society have been responsible for numerous campus traditions, ranging from Cornell songs "Give My Regards to Davy," "Strike Up a Song," and "Fight for Cornell" to the Lynah Rink cowbell cheer.

Beyond Cornell
From 1913 to 1984, Quill and Dagger had at least one member in the U.S. Congress every single year. In recent decades, the society has had a strong presence in the U.S. State Department and related government positions, with two National Security Advisors, two Directors of Policy Planning, and numerous assistant secretaries and senior advisers. Additionally, two members recently served as World Bank presidents, and many members serve on the Council on Foreign Relations. Many of these government officials interact regularly in their professional duties. At least five members of George W. Bush's administration were Quill and Dagger members: Stephen Friedman, Stephen Krasner, Paul Wolfowitz, Stephen Hadley, and Carol Kuntz. President Barack Obama's administration included Deputy Secretary of Labor Seth Harris, Associate Counsel to the President Alison J. Nathan, Deputy Director of the Office of Environmental Quality Gary Guzy, and Assistant Secretary of the Treasury for Financial Markets Mary J. Miller.

During the 1930s through 1950s, the chairmen of Standard Oil, Sun Oil (now Sunoco), and Continental Oil (now ConocoPhillips) companies were Quill and Dagger members, and many other advanced positions in these corporations were held by society members. Younger members who entered the oil industry at this time would gain industry prominence later in the century, with one becoming chairman of Amoco in the 1990s. In the 1960s, the management of Union Carbide, the oldest chemical and polymer company in the country, passed directly from one member to another. In recent years, similar networking appears to be at work in the leading investment banks.

War Memorial

Beginning in 1925, Quill and Dagger members spearheaded the erection of a permanent memorial to Cornellians who served in the First World War. Based on the suggestion of F. Ellis Jackson, a Quill and Dagger member, the architectural plan for West Campus was modified to include the War Memorial structure. Funds for its construction were raised from alumni by a committee chaired by Robert E. Treman, also a society member. The War Memorial was dedicated on May 23, 1931 with a national radio address by President Herbert Hoover. It was erected in remembrance of the 264 Cornellian casualties and nearly 9,000 Cornellians who served during the war. It is the largest of several tributes to military service and sacrifice at Cornell University.

Because of Quill and Dagger's contributions to the War Memorial's construction, the society was granted exclusive use of the top floors of the northern tower. The inscription above the entrance to the building reads, "This tower is a memorial to the men of Quill and Dagger who in giving their lives for their country were true to Cornell traditions." The mural in the first floor War Memorial Shrine also depicts a quill and a dagger prominently, although official descriptions discuss their meaning as a palm and sword.

The War Memorial structure is filled with symbolism relevant to the society and its ideals. For example, six symbols appear on shields around the top of the Quill and Dagger Tower. The east and west sides of the Tower depict four historic variations of a cross: the Latin cross, Saint Andrew's Cross, swastika, and Maltese cross. These four symbols have varying heraldic, religious, and secular meanings including loyalty, piety, bravery, martyrdom, humility, and sacrifice. They also are connected with historic chivalric orders such as the Knights Hospitaller and Knights Templar. The south side of the tower depicts an ankh, which symbolizes life or the power to give and sustain life. Next to the ankh is a menorah, whose light has traditionally represented knowledge or enlightenment.

Membership

Undergraduates are selected for membership in Quill and Dagger in the spring of their junior year or fall of their senior year. Receiving an undergraduate degree from Cornell is not a requirement for honorary membership. Those who served the Cornell Community as well as those who received graduate degrees from Cornell are eligible to be chosen as honorary members. Notable honorary members include Edward Leamington Nichols and Ernest Wilson Huffcut, who graduated from Cornell University before the society was founded, and Janet Reno and Ruth Bader Ginsburg, who graduated before the society accepted women. Cornell University presidents Dale R. Corson, Frank H. T. Rhodes, Hunter R. Rawlings III, and Jeffrey Lehman all hold membership in the society. Nobel Prize-winning chemist Roald Hoffman also received an honorary membership. 

Membership is published in The Cornell Daily Sun each semester. Alumni include:
 194 Cornell University Athletic Hall of Fame members
 37 Frank H. T. Rhodes Exemplary Alumni Service Award winners
 24 Olympic competitors
 13 Rhodes Scholars
 12 of the 100 Most Notable Cornellians
 8 Cornell University Council chairmen
 8 U.S. Congressmen
 7 Pulitzer Prize winners
 6 Cornell University Board of Trustees chairmen
 6 Cornell University Convocation speakers
 4 Cornell University Athletic Directors
 4 Cornell University Entrepreneurs of the Year
 2 United States Directors of Policy Planning
 2 United States National Security Advisors
 2 World Bank presidents
 2 Super Bowl winners
 1 Stanley Cup winner

Other notable alumni who were selected for membership as undergraduates include Sandy Berger, Barber Conable, Adolph Coors III, Ken Dryden, Austin H. Kiplinger, Jules Kroll, Drew Nieporent, Jeremy Schaap, Leah Ward Sears, Jay Walker, Seth Harris, E. B. White, Ben Scrivens, and others.

See also
 Collegiate secret societies in North America

References

Cornell University
1893 establishments in New York (state)
Student organizations established in 1893
Collegiate secret societies
Student societies in the United States
Secret societies in the United States